Hyde Park Barracks may refer to

Hyde Park Barracks, London in England
Hyde Park Barracks, Sydney in Australia